Traditional Vietnamese medicine (Y học Cổ truyền Việt Nam), also known as Southern Herbology (Thuốc Nam) is a traditional medicine practiced by Vietnamese people. It is influenced by traditional Chinese medicine. The other traditional medicine that is also practiced in Vietnam is traditional Chinese medicine (Trung Y), also known as Northern Herbology (Thuốc Bắc). Thuốc Nam is one of two kinds of folk remedies known to villagers, the other being the traditional exercise dưỡng sinh.

Defining principles
Traditional Vietnamese medicine differs from traditional Chinese medicine in which it relies wholly on native ingredients which are then used in their fresh state or simply dried. Vietnamese medicine typically does not require complicated decoction seen in Chinese medicine.

Even common herbs and vegetables like rau răm, kinh giới, cải cúc, rau muống are used. The flowers of Magnolia champaca, Jasminum sambac are also employed for their pharmacologic properties. Animal products like silkworms are infrequently used.

In addition to ingested preparations, ointments and poultice are also part of the repertoire, along with steaming therapy (xông hơi).

Textual records
Various compendiums and treatises on traditional Vietnamese medicine include the 11-volume Nam dược thần hiệu by the 14th century physician Tuệ Tĩnh and Hải Thượng y tông tâm lĩnh by the 18th century physician Hải Thượng Lãn Ông. Other pre-20th century texts include Nam dược chỉ danh truyền, Tiểu nhi khoa diễn Quốc âm.

Application
Thuốc Nam is usually sought for more common ailments like coughs and fevers. Smallpox, a common occurrence in traditional Vietnam, also has a number of prescriptions in historic texts.

Usage in immigrant Vietnamese populations 
According to one study published in 2016, among the urban Vietnamese community near Boston, around 68% of 200 respondents reported using Traditional Vietnamese medicine in addition to Western medical practices.

See also 
 Kampo
 Pharmacognosy
 Traditional Korean medicine

References

Vietnamese culture
Southeast Asian traditional medicine
Science and technology in Vietnam